Stevens Barclais (born July 9, 1984 in Cergy-Pontoise, Île-de-France) is a French taekwondo practitioner. Barclais won the bronze medal in the men's bantamweight (under 63 kg) division at the 2013 World Taekwondo Championships in Puebla.

References

External links
 

1984 births
Living people
Sportspeople from Val-d'Oise
French male taekwondo practitioners
Taekwondo practitioners at the 2015 European Games
European Games competitors for France
Universiade medalists in taekwondo
Universiade silver medalists for France
European Taekwondo Championships medalists
World Taekwondo Championships medalists
Medalists at the 2011 Summer Universiade
21st-century French people